Dallas Stewart (born September 15, 1959 in McComb, Mississippi) trains a string of thoroughbred horses in Kentucky from bases at Churchill Downs, Turfway Park, Keeneland Race Course, Fair Grounds Race Course, Arlington Park and Saratoga Race Course. Before venturing out on his own, he spent 12 years working under the tutelage of leading trainer D. Wayne Lukas. There, he oversaw such horses as Lady's Secret, Thunder Gulch, Serena's Song, Timber Country, Tabasco Cat, and many other Grade I winners.

In 1999, Stewart trained Kimberlite Pipe to win the Grade II Louisiana Derby and Sapphire and Silk to win the Grade III Prioress Stakes at Belmont Park. Stewart won his first training title at the 2000 Keeneland Race Course Spring Meet.  His stakes performers during 2000 included Dollar Bill, who won the Grade II Brown & Williamson Kentucky Jockey Club Stakes at Churchill and competed in all three legs of the Triple Crown.

In 2001, his stabled earned more than $3.8 million, topped by Unbridled Elaine's payday for winning the Grade I Breeders' Cup Distaff. He also won two graded events with Nasty Storm—the Grade II Churchill Downs Distaff Handicap and Grade III Dogwood Stakes. 

In 2002, Stewart won the Grade II Gallant Bloom Handicap at Belmont Park with Nasty Storm, and other stakes with Sweet Nanette, Kazoo and Saintly Look. In 2003, Saintly Look won the Grade III Lecomte Stakes and Stewart also won the Mardi Gras Handicap at Fair Grounds with Even the Score and the Perryville Stakes at Keeneland Race Course with Clock Stopper.

In 2006, he won the Kentucky Oaks (G1) with Lemons Forever, which was the longest shot to ever win the race.  He was the trainer of multiple graded stakes winners Silverfoot and  Macho Again.  Stewart won his first stakes at storied Saratoga Race Course when Macho Again won the 2008 Jim Dandy Stakes.

In the 2013 Kentucky Derby Dallas Stewart's horse, a colt named Golden Soul, finished second to winner Orb. Golden Soul's odds were 50-1, and he was one of five colts at those odds, the other four being Falling Sky, Frac Daddy, Vyjack, and Giant Finish. In the 2014 Kentucky Derby, a Dallas Stewart trainee once again finished second; 37-1 Commanding Curve. Commanding Curve retired from racing in 2016, and is now in training with Olympic equestrian Phillip Dutton.

In 2016, Saint's Fan, a chestnut colt that Stewart bred, trains, and owns himself, won the $100,000 Louisiana Champions Day Juvenile Stakes at Fair Grounds Racecourse in New Orleans, Louisiana. Another trainee, Tom's Ready, won the 2016 Gr.II Woody Stevens Stakes and Gr.III Ack Ack Handicap, before finishing fifth in the Breeders' Cup Dirt Mile to Tamarkuz.

References

 Dallas Stewart Biography from NTRA
 Dallas Stewart Racing Page
 Jim Dandy Win Article
 Derby Trial Article from Churchill Downs
 Jim Dandy article from ESPN

1959 births
Horse trainers from Louisville, Kentucky
American horse trainers
Living people